Aponotoreas epicrossa is a moth of the family Geometridae. It is known from Australia, including Tasmania.

References

Hydriomenini
Moths of Australia
Moths described in 1891